Ulf Johansson (born May 26, 1967) is a former Swedish biathlete. At the 1992 Olympics in Albertville, Johansson won a bronze medal in the 4 x 7.5 km relay with the Swedish team.  His teammates were Mikael Löfgren, Tord Wiksten, and Leif Andersson.

References

Sports Reference

1967 births
Living people
Swedish male biathletes
Biathletes at the 1992 Winter Olympics
Biathletes at the 1994 Winter Olympics
Olympic medalists in biathlon
Medalists at the 1992 Winter Olympics
Olympic bronze medalists for Sweden
Olympic biathletes of Sweden
20th-century Swedish people